Harry Laurence Anderson  is a British chemist in the Department of Chemistry, University of Oxford. He is well known for his contributions in the syntheses of supramolecular systems (porphyrin nanorings and nanowires), exploration of the extraordinary physical properties of large pi-conjugated systems, and synthesis of cyclo[18]carbon. He is a Professor of Chemistry at Keble College, Oxford.

Education 
Harry Anderson studied chemistry at Christ Church, University of Oxford, where he received his Bachelor of Arts degree in 1987. This was followed by graduate studies under Jeremy Sanders at the University of Cambridge, where he received his doctoral degree in 1990.

Career and Research 
Anderson started his independent research as a research fellow at Magdalene College, Cambridge in 1990–1993, and conducted his research in 1993–1994 as SERC postdoctoral research fellow at ETH-Zürich, Switzerland. He returned to University of Oxford in 1994 as university lecturer in organic chemistry and tutor in Keble College. In 2004, he became professor of chemistry at the University of Oxford.

Template directed syntheses ubiquitously exist in nature (protein biosynthesis, etc.), which provides inspiration for synthesising artificial supramolecular systems. Using porphyrin monomers/oligomers and molecular templates of various sizes, porphyrin nanoring systems can be constructed with high versatility. These supramolecular systems also bear appealing co-ordination properties, providing inspirations for the co-ordination phenomena existing in nature.

Vernier templating refers to the syntheses of complexes using templates and molecular building blocks with mismatching co-ordination numbers to construct larger molecular systems by incorporating more than one template molecule and more molecular building blocks than usual. Porphyrin nanoring systems are excellent examples in realising this methodology and giant artificial molecular systems with their molecular weights of small proteins can be constructed.

Based on the work of organic synthesis, his research interests have found wide range of collaborators from versatile academic backgrounds all over the world. It was found that elongated/encapsulated pi-conjugate systems constructed by porphyrins showed unprecedented physical properties in charge transfer, two-photon absorption, etc., thereby providing physicists and photobiologists new candidates and inspirations in their research.

Honours and awards
 2017 Izatt-Christensen Award (in Macrocyclic and Supramolecular Chemistry)
 2013 Elected a Fellow of the Royal Society.
2008 Merck-Karl Pfister Visiting Professor in Organic Chemistry, MIT, USA
2006 RSC Industrially-Sponsored Award for Supramolecular Chemistry
2003 Royal Society of Chemistry Award for Materials Chemistry
2003 Bob Hay Lecturer (Royal Society of Chemistry, Macrocyclic Chemistry)
2001 Corday Morgan Medal and Prize from the Royal Society of Chemistry
1995 Nuffield Foundation Award to Newly Appointed Science Lecturers
1993 NATO/SERC Research Fellowship

Anderson's nomination for the Royal Society in 2013 reads:

References 

British chemists
Fellows of the Royal Society
Alumni of Christ Church, Oxford
Fellows of Keble College, Oxford
Living people
1964 births